"" is the fifth single released by Japanese pop duo Puffy AmiYumi. It was released on December 12, 1997.  The music video features Ami and Yumi playing guitars and singing on a roof. Mother was used as the 1997 drama Eve's theme song.

Track listing
 ""
 ""
 ""
 " "

References

Puffy AmiYumi songs
1997 singles
Japanese television drama theme songs